Hipólito, Hipolito or Hypólito is a masculine given name and surname related to Hippolyte. People so named include:

Given name
 Hipolito Arenas (1907–1995), Negro league baseball player
 Hipólito or Hippolyte Bouchard (1780–1837), French-born Argentine corsair
 Hipólito Boaventura Caron (1862–1892), Brazilian painter and designer
 Hipólito da Costa (1774–1823), Brazilian journalist and diplomat considered the "father of the Brazilian press"
 Hipólito Fernández Serrano (born 1977), Spanish retired footballer known as Poli
 Hipólito Anacarsis Lanús (1820–1888), Argentine entrepreneur
 Hipólito Lázaro (1887–1974), Catalan-Spanish opera singer
 Hipólito Mejía (born 1941), Dominican politician, President of the Dominican Republic from 2000 to 2004
 Hipólito Peña (born 1964), Dominican former Major League Baseball pitcher
 Hipólito Pichardo (born 1969), Dominican former Major League Baseball pitcher
 Hipólito Ramos (born 1956), Cuban retired boxer
 Hipólito Reyes Larios (1946–2021), Mexican Roman Catholic prelate, bishop and archbishop
 Hipólito Ruiz López (1754–1816), Spanish botanist
 Hipólito Rincón (born 1957), Spanish former footballer
 Hipólito Rodríguez Caorsi (1939–2012), Uruguayan lawyer and judge, member of the Supreme Court of Uruguay
 Hipólito Unanue (1755–1833), Peruvian physician, naturalist, meteorologist, cosmographer, first Minister of Finance of Peru, Minister of Foreign Affairs, politician and university professor
 Hipólito Yrigoyen (1852–1933), Argentine politician, two-time President of Argentina

Surname
 Carlos Hipólito (born 1956), Spanish actor
 Daniele Hypólito (born 1984), Brazilian artistic gymnast
 Diego Hypólito (born 1986), Brazilian artistic gymnast, brother of Daniele
 Mário Hipólito (born 1985), Angolan football goalkeeper
 Moisés Hipólito (born 1992), Mexican footballer
 Pedro Hipólito (born 1978), Portuguese football manager and former player
 Reynaldo Alfredo R. Hipolito, Sr. (1933–2010), Filipino slapstick comedian and actor known as Palito
 Verônica Hipólito (born 1996), Brazilian para-athletics sprinter

Masculine given names